Dmitri Vladimirovich Chorny (born 10 March 1975 in Moscow) is a Russian historic preservation activist, journalist, poet, and writer. He is also a musician. He is a member of the United Communist Party (since 2014). He is a member of the Central Auditing Commission of the United Communist Party. He was a member of the Central Committee of the United Communist Party (2017–2018).

Biography 
Chorny graduated from the Moscow State University of Psychology and Education. He is a psychologist. In 2000, he joined the Leninist Komsomol of the Russian Federation.
He was a member of the Central Committee of the Leninist Komsomol of the Russian Federation.

He became a Clerk of the Central Committee of the Communist Party of the Russian Federation in 2001. From 2004 to 2007, he administered the official website of the Communist Party of the Russian Federation.

In 2010 he married and became a father to daughter. He published in Sovetskaya Rossiya, Nash Sovremennik. He is the author of four books of poetry (1999, 2000, 2001, 2013). He was criticized by Roman Senchin.

He was longlisted for the 2008 National Bestseller Prize.
He is a "Literary Russia" newspaper award winner (2010).

References

1975 births
Living people
Russian political activists
Russian opinion journalists
Russian poets
21st-century Russian poets
Russian male poets
Russian male songwriters